Ben-Zion Shabbtai "Boni" Ginzburg (or Bonni, ; born 12 December 1964) is an Israeli footballer who played as a goalkeeper and retired in 2001. He played for 11 different clubs during his extensive career from 1983 to 2001, and collected 68 caps for Israel.

Early life

Ben-Zion Shabbtai Ginzburg was born in Tel Aviv, Israel, to a family of Ashkenazi Jewish descent. His father died of a heart attack when he was eight.

Club career
In 1983, at the age of 16, he joined Maccabi Tel Aviv FC as a goalkeeper. He also played for Maccabi Petah Tikva FC, Maccabi Haifa F.C. and Beitar Jerusalem FC, before signing for Rangers in 1989.

After two seasons in Glasgow playing second-fiddle to England's Chris Woods, Ginzburg returned home, representing successively Maccabi Yavne FC, Beitar Tel Aviv FC, Maccabi Ironi Ashdod FC, Bnei Yehuda Tel Aviv FC, Maccabi Haifa FC, Hapoel Ashkelon F.C. and Hapoel Kfar Saba FC, and retiring at nearly 37.

International career
Ginzburg made his debut for Israel 10 June 1984 in a friendly with Wales keeping a clean sheet as the game ended 0–0. His last match was in another exhibition game, this time against Romania on 14 August 1996, a 0–2 away loss.

In addition to the 62 caps won in FIFA-recognised games, Ginzburg gained another six in qualifying games for the 1988 Olympic football tournament. In his full side appearances he kept 15 clean sheets, adding four in the Olympic ones.

Media career
After retiring Ginzburg began working, eventually as the main presenter, for Channel One's Rishon beSha'ar, a football highlights programme. He also participated in Israel's version of Dancing with the Stars. Nowadays, Boni works as a commentator for the Israeli sports channel Sport 5.

Awards and recognition
Israeli Cup: 1986–87, 1988–89

See also
Sports in Israel
Television in Israel

References

External links
Maccabi Haifa player profile 

1964 births
Israeli Ashkenazi Jews
Jewish footballers
Living people
Israeli footballers
Maccabi Tel Aviv F.C. players
Maccabi Petah Tikva F.C. players
Maccabi Haifa F.C. players
Beitar Jerusalem F.C. players
Maccabi Yavne F.C. players
Beitar Tel Aviv F.C. players
Maccabi Ironi Ashdod F.C. players
Bnei Yehuda Tel Aviv F.C. players
Hapoel Ashkelon F.C. players
Hapoel Kfar Saba F.C. players
Rangers F.C. players
Israel international footballers
Israeli expatriate footballers
Expatriate footballers in Scotland
Israeli expatriate sportspeople in Scotland
Liga Leumit players
Israeli Premier League players
Scottish Football League players
Footballers from Tel Aviv
Association football goalkeepers
Israeli Football Hall of Fame inductees